Azerbaijan Caspian Shipping Closed Joint-Stock Company is an Azerbaijani shipping company. It is also known as CASPAR (from the Russian Каспийское пароходство).

The merchant fleet of the company consists of 98 vessels: 34 tankers, 15 ferries, 14 universal dry-cargo, 2 Ro-Ro and 35 different auxiliary ships. The offshore support fleet consists of 188 vessels, including 21 crane vessels, 22 supply and tug vessels, 29 passenger ships, 2 pipelay barges, 7 firefighting vessels, 5 geological survey vessels, 11 diving support vessels, and 84 other support vessels.

History 

The history of the Caspian Shipping Company goes back to 21 May 1858, when “The Caucasus and Mercury” Joint-Stock Company was established in Baku.

On 6 June 1920 the Chairmen of the Council of People's Commissars of Azerbaijan SSR Nariman Narimanov signed a decree on nationalization of the Caspian merchant fleet. The public fleet consisted of 390 vessels of various tonnage, including 106 sailships. On 1 October 1923 the Public Joint-Stock Caspian Shipping Company was created.

By the decree of the President of the Azerbaijan Republic dated 22 October 2013 the country's two largest fleets - the Azerbaijan State Caspian Sea Shipping Company and the Caspian Sea Oil Fleet of the State Oil Company of Azerbaijan Republic were merged, and the "Azerbaijan Caspian Shipping" Closed Joint-Stock Company was established.

International Maritime Organization 
Since 1995 Azerbaijan has been a member of the International Maritime Organization, which is responsible for enhancing the reliability and safety of navigation in international trade and for preventing marine pollution from ships.

Since January 2000 the Azerbaijan State Marine Academy has been included in the catalog of maritime training institutions of the International Maritime Organization under the number 012.

Ferry fleet 
 Balakan
 Barda
 Nakhchivan
 Karabakh
 Shahdag
 Academician Hasan Aliyev
 Professor Gul
 Merkuri-1
 Academician Topchubashov
 Sheki
 Aghdam
 Ordubad
 Dagestan
 Azerbaijan
 Zarifa Aliyeva

References

Sources

655

Dry bulk shipping companies
Shipping companies of Azerbaijan
Shipping companies of the Soviet Union
Companies established in 1858
Companies nationalised by the Soviet Union